Monoculturalism is the policy or process of supporting, advocating, or allowing the expression of the culture of a single social or ethnic group. It generally stems from beliefs within the dominant group that their cultural practices are superior to those of minority groups and is similar to the concept of ethnocentrism which involves judging another culture, based on the values and standards of one's own culture. It may also involve the process of assimilation whereby other ethnic groups are expected to adopt the culture and practices of the dominant ethnic group. Monoculturalism, in the context of cultural diversity, is the opposite of multiculturalism. 
 
Rather than the suppression of different ethnic groups within a given society, sometimes monoculturalism manifests as the active preservation of a country's national culture via the exclusion of external influences. Japan, South Korea, and North Korea are examples of this form of monoculturalism. However it may also be the result of less intentional factors such as geographic isolation, historical racial homogeneity, or political isolation. For instance, some European countries such as Italy, Portugal, Poland and the Northern European countries are still effectively monocultural because of the shared ethnicity and culture of the people, along with low immigration rates.

Ethnocentric monoculturalism 
Monoculturalism is closely associated with ethnocentrism. Ethnocentrism is the practice of framing one's way of life as natural and valid, and applying that belief system to interpret the characteristics of other cultures.

Instances

In genocide 

Many of the genocides practiced throughout history were based on ethnic supremacy. Ethnic supremacy is assumed by one group within a culture, following some distinct action by an external group or from one of the ethnic groups. With European intervention in places like Rwanda, social institutions worked to socially construct an ethnic inferiority, distinguishing the Hutus and Tutsis from one another and causing what would be one of the most horrific demonstrations of genocide in modern history.

A similar example to that of the Rwandan genocide was the ongoing civil war in Burma. The civil war spanned from a constitution that granted Burma their independence from the British Empire in which a group of leaders created conditions that didn't involve many of Burma's Ethnic Minorities, and instigated a fight from them. Many of these ethnic minorities in Burma, including the Karen, have been significantly displaced by the military junta and placed into refugee camps in bordering nations. The remaining ethnic minorities have been living in poor conditions, and have been met by a variety of human rights abuses.

Globalization 
Globalization involves the free movement of goods, capital, services, people, technology and information throughout the world. It also involves the international integration of potentially very different countries through the adoption of the same or similar world views, ideologies, and other aspects of culture. Marsella argues that this is monoculturalism on a grand scale. Potentially it could lead to the suppression and loss of different ethnic cultures on a global scale.

See also 
 Criticism of multiculturalism
 Cultural homogenization
 Monoethnicity

References

Further reading

Ethnicity
Ethnocentrism
Cultural geography
Cultural assimilation
Sociology of culture
Social ideologies
Political ideologies